Remington .22 Junior Special Long and Short is a Bolt-action rifle launched in the 1930s by Remington Arms.

It is fitted with a peep sight set which is much more accurate than regular iron sights. The rifle is lightweight and sturdy. It comes with a 5-round detachable loading magazine that inserts from underneath the firing chamber. The only problem with this rifle is that the magazine was built cheaply and sometimes splits in half, however this does not affect the rifle in any way except in the speed in which you reload.

The rifle uses three types of ammunition: .22 long, .22 short, and .22 long rifle.

References

Further reading
 Bolt-action
 Remington Arms

Bolt-action rifles of the United States